Maciej Jaworek (born 24 February 1961) is a former international speedway rider from Poland.

Speedway career 
Jaworek was the champion of Poland, winning the Polish Individual Speedway Championship in 1986.

References 

Living people
1961 births
Polish speedway riders